Sandra Scott may refer to:
 Sandra Scott (politician), member of the Georgia House of Representatives
 Sandra Scott (pilot), United States Air Force officer
 Tiffany Million, also known as Sandra Scott, American professional wrestler and pornographic performer